Mill Hill near Concord, North Carolina is a historic house built by master craftsman Jacob Stirewalt in 1821.  It includes Greek Revival and Federal architectural elements.

A number of its features, including a distinctive fireplace mantel, are documented in a North Carolina State University collection.
The Johnson-Neel House is also attributed to Stirewalt, due in part to its having a similar mantelpiece (and is also NRHP-listed).

It was listed on the National Register of Historic Places in 1974.

References 

Houses on the National Register of Historic Places in North Carolina
Federal architecture in North Carolina
Greek Revival houses in North Carolina
Houses completed in 1821
Houses in Cabarrus County, North Carolina
National Register of Historic Places in Cabarrus County, North Carolina